George McCowan (June 27, 1927 – November 1, 1995) was a Canadian film and television director in the 1960s, 1970s and 1980s.

McCowan began his career working for the Canadian Broadcasting Corporation. He worked as an actor and director for several seasons at the Stratford Festival, and moved to the United States in 1967.

He directed episodes of Charlie's Angels, S.W.A.T., and Starsky and Hutch, as well as every episode of the popular Canadian series Seeing Things. He also worked on such shows as The Silent Force, The Mod Squad, The Streets of San Francisco, Fantasy Island, and Hart to Hart. McCowan directed the 1970 TV movie Carter's Army, the 1971 Canadian hockey film Face-Off, the fourth and final Magnificent Seven film, The Magnificent Seven Ride! in 1972, the cult horror film Frogs in the same year, and the 1976 film Shadow of the Hawk.

McCowan also directed the film H. G. Wells' The Shape of Things to Come and the 1970 television war movie, The Challenge, but for the latter he chose to be credited as Alan Smithee.

McCowan died of emphysema on November 1, 1995, in Santa Monica, California.

References

External links

Canadian film directors
Canadian television directors
1927 births
1995 deaths
Canadian expatriate film directors in the United States